Lee Geon-yeop (Hangul: 이건엽; born 18 August 1994) is a South Korean footballer who plays for Seongnam FC.

On 28 December 2016, Seongnam FC announced 3 new recruits from 2017 open test, Lee Geon-yeop was one of the successful candidate. He is the first Professional football player from Seoul National University since Hwangbo Kwan(1988) and Yang Ik-jeon(1989).

References 

1994 births
South Korean footballers
Living people
Association football forwards